Gerard II was Count of Guelders from March 1129 until his death on October 24, 1131. He was the son of Gerard I, Count of Guelders.

Around 1116, Gerard married Ermgard of Zutphen, daughter of Otto II, Count of Zutphen and Judith of Arnstein. They had two children:
 Henry I, Count of Guelders married Agnes of Arnstein, daughter of count Louis III of Arnstein.
 Salome of Guelders, married Henry I, Count of Wildeshausen.

References

1090s births
1131 deaths
House of Wassenberg
Gerard
11th-century people of the Holy Roman Empire
12th-century people of the Holy Roman Empire